The Eternal Empire is a 1994 South Korean film directed by Park Jong-won. It was chosen as Best Film at the Grand Bell Awards.

Plot
A historical drama depicting political intrigue and power struggles in the early 19th century.

Cast
Ahn Sung-ki as Lee San, King Jeongjo
Cho Jae-hyun as Lee In-mong
Kim Hye-soo as Yoon Sang-ah
Kim Myung-gon as Jeong Yak-yong
Choi Jong-won as Shim Hwan-ji
Kim Hee-ra as Lee Jo-won
Lee Seung-cheol as Seo Yong-soo
Kim Il-woo as Jeong Choon-gyo
Im Il-chan as Goo Jae-gyum
Kim Jae-rok as Lee Jung-rae
Shin Cheol-jin as Hyun Seung-heon
Hyun Gil-soo as Captain Jang Yong-young
Kwon Il-soo as Seo In-sung
Yoo Soon-chul as Lee Shi-soo
Jang In-han as Nam Han-jo
Jang Jung-kook as Kwon Chul-shin
Son Jeon as Young-Jo
Na Gap-sung as Ok-Jang
Hong Suk-yeon as Captain Hoon-Ryun
Lee Byung-joon as Captain Po-Do
Park Jong-chul as Chae Yi-sook / Chae Je-gong
Park Choong-sun as Left State Councillor
Kim Ji-woon as Left State Councillor
Kim Sang-bae as Right State Councillor
Choi Young-rae as Goo Jae-gyum's teacher
Lee Kyung-jin as a Warrior
Kim Kyung-ran as Moo-Dang
Hong Kyung-in as Crown Prince Lee Gong
Jo Hak-ja as Na-Pa
Im Jin-taek as Gum-yool

Bibliography

References

External links

1994 drama films
South Korean political films
Films set in the 18th century
Films set in the Joseon dynasty
Films based on Korean novels
Best Picture Grand Bell Award winners
1990s Korean-language films
South Korean historical films